In algebraic graph theory, the adjacency algebra of a graph G is the algebra of polynomials in the adjacency matrix A(G) of the graph. It is an example of a matrix algebra and is  the set  of the linear combinations of powers of A.

Some other similar mathematical objects are also called "adjacency algebra".

Properties

Properties of the adjacency algebra of G are associated with various spectral, adjacency and connectivity properties of G.

Statement. The number of walks of length d between vertices i and j is equal to the (i, j)-th element of Ad.

Statement. The dimension of the adjacency algebra of a connected graph of diameter d is at least d + 1.

Corollary. A connected graph of diameter d has at least d + 1 distinct eigenvalues.

References

Algebraic graph theory